Hatred, Passions and Infidelity is the second album from hip hop producer and emcee Diamond D, released five years after his acclaimed debut, Stunts, Blunts and Hip Hop.  The reason for the extended time between albums was due primarily to the legal battle between Diamond D and his then label PWL America Records. After the issues were resolved between him and the company, he was released from PWL America and recorded for the label's parent company Mercury Records. The album received positive reviews from music critics and fans.

In the period between his album releases, Diamond spent time producing a number of artists, including Brand Nubian, Cypress Hill, Fat Joe, The Fugees, House of Pain, KRS-One, Lord Finesse, Tha Alkaholiks, The Pharcyde, Illegal, and Xzibit. Hatred, Passions, and Infidelity features the single "The Hiatus" and the Kid Capri-produced D.I.T.C. crew cut "5 Fingas of Death."

Track listing

Album singles

Chart positions

Album

Singles

References

1997 albums
Diamond D albums
Mercury Records albums
Albums produced by Buckwild
Albums produced by Lord Finesse
Albums produced by Diamond D